Cetu Javu was a German synthpop band that was active between 1987 and 1994, consisting of singer Javier Revilla Diez, Chris Demere on keyboards, Stefan Engelke and Torsten Engelke. 

Vocalist Revilla Diez was born in Germany, and although his parents had emigrated from Spain, most of his songs are sung in English with several in Spanish. Cetu Javu had several dance hits with "Situations", "Have In Mind (The Kalimba Mix)" and "A Dónde".

After Cetu Javu ended, vocalist Revilla Diez became a professor of geography at the Leibniz University Hannover. Since April 2014, Revilla Diez holds a Chair in human geography at the Institute of Geography at the University of Cologne.

On November 19, 2020, after 25 years without appearing in any media, Javier Revilla gave an exclusive interview with Spanish radio host Miguel Moreno in which he told the entire story of the Group.

Cetu Javu released two albums, Southern Lands (ZYX Records, 1990) and Where Is Where (Blanco y Negro Music, 1992).

Discography

Studio albums

Compilation albums

Singles

Bibliography 
 Matthias Blazek: Das niedersächsische Bandkompendium 1963–2003 – Daten und Fakten von 100 Rockgruppen aus Niedersachsen. Celle 2006, p. 36

References

External links 
  (actually offline)
 Profile on Last.fm
 Discography on Discogs 

German new wave musical groups
German electronic music groups
Synth-pop new wave musical groups
Musical groups from Hanover